Jallo Park is a national park of Pakistan located in Lahore, Punjab.

Facilities at Jallo Park include a Forest Research Centre, Wildlife Breeding Center, restaurants, coffee shops, a theme park, a sports complex, swimming pool, and a large lake for fishing and boating. It is currently funded by Punjab Wildlife and Parks Department of Government of Punjab. It is easily accessible by taxi, TransLahore buses and Lahore City Commuter trains that stop at Jallo Railway Station.
Now the area of 100 acre is allotted to the Parks and Horticulture Authority Lahore by govt of Punjab there PHA established Botanical Garden Jallo and Butterfly House facility for the public.

History
Jallo Park was established in 1978, as a recreation park for public.  of the park has been allocated as a breeding center for wildlife. In 2007, many sambar and chital deer were brought to the park for breeding. A number of birds, such as species of pheasants and parrots, were also added to the park.

In 2008, the Government of Punjab took steps for the development and beautification of the park. A sports complex was added which included courts for lawn tennis and volleyball, grounds for cricket and soccer, and a  track for bicycling. The park also has a public swimming pool.

Jallo Park Railway Station
It is a busy railway station located in Jallo Park. It is one of the sub-urban stations of the Lahore city which are served by commuter trains of Lahore. A large number of commuters use this station to get access to the city of Lahore.

Species list
Aves
Common pheasant
Indian peafowl
Rock pigeon
Mammals
Asian black bear
Bactrian camel
Chital
Chinkara
Sambar
Reptiles
Indian cobra
Mugger crocodile

Incidents
Between November 2007 and May 2008 as much as 80 captive birds died, reportedly due to poor hygiene, harsh weather, bad nutrition and lack of medical facilities. These included common pheasants, Indian peafowls and rock pigeons among others.

In July 2008, a driver was bitten by an Indian cobra and died afterwards. Similar incidents with resident animals and visitors were also reported in the park.

See also 
 List of parks and gardens in Lahore
 List of parks and gardens in Pakistan
 List of parks and gardens in Karachi

References

External links
Profile at tdcp.gop.pk

Zoos in Pakistan
Parks in Lahore
Tourist attractions in Lahore
Wildlife parks in Pakistan